This is a list of Sites of Community Importance in the Region of Murcia.

See also 
 List of Sites of Community Importance in Spain

References 
 Lisf of sites of community importance in Region of Murcia

Sites